Uncle Nick is a 2015 American comedy film directed by Chris Kasick, written by Mike Demski, and starring Brian Posehn, Paget Brewster, Missi Pyle, Scott Adsit, Beau Ballinger and Melia Renee. It was released on December 4, 2015, by Dark Sky Films.

Cast
Brian Posehn as Uncle Nick
Paget Brewster as Sophie
Missi Pyle as Michelle
Scott Adsit as Kevin
Beau Ballinger as Cody
Melia Renee as Valerie
Jacob Houston as Marcus
Joe Nunez as Luis
Annie Savage as Emily

Release
The film was released on December 4, 2015, by Dark Sky Films.

References

External links
 

2015 films
2010s English-language films
2015 comedy films
American comedy films
2010s American films